Charles Webster (9 June 1838 – 6 January 1881) was an English first-class cricketer, active 1858–68, who played for Sheffield and Yorkshire. Born in Ecclesall, Sheffield, Webster was a right-handed batsman, who scored 30 runs at an average of 7.50, with a best score of 10. He also held two catches. He died in Ecclesall, in January 1881.

References

External links
Cricinfo Profile

1838 births
1881 deaths
Yorkshire cricketers
Cricketers from Sheffield
English cricketers
English cricketers of 1826 to 1863
English cricketers of 1864 to 1889